Supreme Evil is an LP released by death metal band Diabolic in 1998.

Track listing 
 "Insacred" – 0:25 
 "Sacrament Of Fiends" – 3:01 
 "Ancient Hatred" - 2:25
 "Treacherous Scriptures" – 3:03
 "Grave Warnings" – 3:11 
 "Rack Of Torment" – 4:33
 "View With Abhorrence" – 3:15
 "Dwelling Spirits" – 4:57
 "Wicked Inclination" – 2:34
 "Supreme Evil" – 4:46

References

1999 albums
Diabolic albums